Lieutenant-Colonel Leonard Berney (11 April 1920 – 7 March 2016) was a British soldier who was one of the first British officers at the liberation of Bergen-Belsen. He also testified in the Belsen trial.

In 2015 to mark the 70th anniversary of the end of the Holocaust, he published the memoir Liberating Belsen Concentration Camp - A Personal Account by (former) Lt-Colonel Leonard Berney. He attended Brighton College and then St Paul's School, London 1933-38.

External links

 Facebook Page

References

1920 births
2016 deaths
21st-century English memoirists
British Army personnel of World War II
Royal Artillery officers
Military personnel from London
People educated at St Paul's School, London
Bergen-Belsen concentration camp
People educated at Brighton College